CG Cygni is a  ternary star system composed of main-sequence stars in the constellation of Cygnus about  away.

System 
The star CG Cygni A (BD+34 4217A) itself is a close binary system with ongoing mass transfer between components. The orbital period of the binary is currently increasing. An additional third body (either star or planet) was suspected to exist in the system with an orbital period of 15.9-51 years, creating cyclic period variations of the binary. It was finally confirmed as the star CG Cygni B (BD+34 4217B) in 2020, at a 1.16 arcsecond separation from the primary.

Properties 
The primary, BD+34 4217Aa, has a large number of starspots covering up to 18% of its surface. These are located in low latitudes, usually perpendicular to the line connecting the stars Aa and Ab, although reversal of the starspots positions was detected in 1991, 2003 and 2008.

References 

Triple star systems
RS Canum Venaticorum variables
Cygnus (constellation)
103505
J20581343+3510298
BD+34 4217
Cygni, CG